Social Networks is a quarterly  peer-reviewed academic journal covering research on social network theory. The editors-in-chief are Thomas Valente (University of Southern California) and Martin Everett (University of Manchester). It was established in 1979 and is currently published by Elsevier.

Abstracting and indexing 
Social Networks is abstracted and indexed in:
 Anthropological Index
 Anthropological Literature
 Current Contents/Social & Behavioral Sciences
 Scopus
 Social Sciences Citation Index
 Sociological Abstracts
According to the Journal Citation Reports, its 2011 impact factor was 2.931, ranking it 6th out of 137 journals in the category "Sociology". In 2020, the impact factor is 2.376.

References

External links 
 

Publications established in 1979
Sociology journals
Social networks
Elsevier academic journals
English-language journals
Quarterly journals